Democratic Convergence of La Franja (in Catalan: Convergència Democràtica de la Franja; CDF) is a catalanist and liberal political party active in the Catalan-speaking area of Aragon, known as La Franja.

Objectives
CDF has two main objectives:
 Defence of the Catalan language and culture in La Franja.
 Improving the infraestrucure, social services and economy of La Franja.

History
CDF was founded in 2009 by splitters of Alternativa Cívica, a local party in the municipality of Fraga. In the European elections of the same year the secretary-general of the party participated in the list of Democratic Convergence of Catalonia (CDC).

In the local elections of 2011 CDF gained 4 town councillors and 1 mayor, in Pont de Montanyana/Puente de Montañana. In the same elections, CDF gained the 7.8% of the vote in Arén, 16% in Sopeira, 2.29% in Benabarri/Benabarre and 3.28% in Fraga.

The party opposed the new Aragonese languages law of 2013, which they considered anti-Catalan.

CDF did not participate in the local elections of 2015.

References

Political parties established in 2009
Political parties in Aragon
Catalan nationalist parties